Dina Koutsouflakis, known professionally as Storry (stylized in all caps), is a Canadian singer, songwriter, producer, director, and visual artist. She is a two-time Juno Award nominee, receiving nods for Reggae Recording of the Year at the Juno Awards of 2020 for her single "Another Man", and for Adult Contemporary Album of the Year for her album CH III: The Come Up.

Life and career
Dina Koutsouflakis was born in Canada to Lebanese and Greek parents. Raised in the Rexdale neighbourhood of Toronto, Ontario, she studied opera at Vanier College and shortly at the University of Toronto. While attending university, she embarked on a relationship that soon turned abusive, with her partner coercing her into work as an exotic dancer and controlling both her finances and her social contact with friends and family. When the relationship ended, she took a trip to India to study yoga, but decided to recommit herself to music after encountering repeated omens that music was the path she was meant to take.

She released CH III: The Come Up, her debut concept album, in February 2020, and followed up in September with the EP Interlude-19.

She identifies as pansexual.

References

External links

21st-century Canadian women singers
Canadian women pop singers
Canadian women singer-songwriters
Canadian rhythm and blues singers
Canadian people of Greek descent
Canadian LGBT singers
Musicians from Toronto
University of Toronto alumni
Pansexual musicians
Living people
Year of birth missing (living people)
21st-century Canadian LGBT people